Teucrium grandiusculum is a species of flowering plant in the family Lamiaceae and is endemic to central Australia. It is a perennial herb or shrub with toothed, egg-shaped leaves and white flowers.

Description
The flowers are borne in groups of up to three with leaf-like bracts at the base.

Taxonomy
Teucrium grandiusculum was formally described in 1890 by Ferdinand von Mueller and Ralph Tate in Transactions, Proceedings and Report, Royal Society of South Australia. The specific epithet (grandiusculum) means "very nearly grown up".

In 1985, Hellmut R. Toelken described two subspecies of T. grandiusculum and the names are accepted by the Australian Plant Census:

Distribution and habitat
This germander grows on rocky slopes and along watercourses in scattered locations on the Tomkinson Ranges near the border between Western Australia, South Australia the Northern Territory. Subspecies pilosum is only known from two locations near Ooldea.

Conservation status
Teucrium grandiusculum is classified as "not threatened" by the Western Australian Government Department of Parks and Wildlife but as "near threatened" under the Northern Territory Government Territory Parks and Wildlife Conservation Act 1976.

References

grandiusculum
Lamiales of Australia
Plants described in 1905
Taxa named by Ralph Tate
Eudicots of Western Australia
Flora of South Australia
Flora of the Northern Territory
Taxa named by Ferdinand von Mueller